One Stone is the second studio album by American drag queen Trixie Mattel, released on March 16, 2018. In June 2018, One Stone was listed by Billboard as one of the best albums of the year so far.

Promotion
The lead single, "Moving Parts", was released following the premiere of the third season of RuPaul's Drag Race: All Stars, in which Trixie Mattel competed. One Stone was released after the season finale.

The music video for "Break Your Heart" was released on March 17.

Track listing

Track listing adapted from the iTunes Store

Personnel

Brian Firkus/Trixie Mattel – songwriting , lead vocals , guitars , auto-harp 
Brandon James Gwinn – production , background vocals , violin , drums , cajón , trumpet

Charts

References

Further reading
 

2018 albums
Self-released albums
Trixie Mattel albums
Country folk albums